André Grisoni (1886–1975) was a French politician. He served as a member of the Chamber of Deputies from 1932 to 1936, representing Seine.

References

1886 births
1975 deaths
People from Haute-Corse
Corsican politicians
Radical Party (France) politicians
Independent Radical politicians
National Popular Rally politicians
Members of the 15th Chamber of Deputies of the French Third Republic